Dombivli Assembly constituency is one of the 288 Vidhan Sabha (legislative assembly) constituencies of Maharashtra state, western India. This constituency is located in Thane district.

Geographical scope
The constituency comprises parts of Kalyan taluka that is Ward Nos.
57 to 65, 68 and 78 to 96 of  Kalyan Dombivli Municipal Corporation.

List of Members of Legislative Assembly

Election results

Assembly Elections 2009

Assembly Elections 2014

References

Assembly constituencies of Thane district
Kalyan-Dombivli
Assembly constituencies of Maharashtra